Nirmand is a village located in Kullu district, of the Indian state of Himachal Pradesh. It is one of the largest villages in Himachal Pradesh and serves as the headquarters of Nirmand Tehsil and Nirmand developmental block of Kullu district.

Overlooking the Satluj valley in the lesser-known Seraj region of Kullu district, and about 150 km from Shimla and 17 km from Rampur, is the large Nirmand village. This village has been in existence since the early Vedic period, making it one of the oldest rural settlements in India. A number of ancient stone and wooden temples dating back to the 6th and the 7th centuries A.D. speak of Nirmand’s religious and historical importance. For this reason it is often called the "Kashi of the Himalayas."

Temples
One of the ancient shrines in the village is dedicated to Goddess Ambika, a form of the Hindu Goddess Durga. Although the original structure has been altered, several old stone sculptures have been preserved in the temple complex. A unique feature of the temple is its roof, which is made of pure copper sheets. Another temple nearby, called Dakshineshwar Mahadev Temple or Deccani Mahadev Temple, is dedicated to Lord Shiva. Its lingam is believed to have been brought from Deccan, and hence the name. The temple is renowned for its intricately carved wooden doors and pillars that are probably the finest examples of woodcarving in the state. Nirmand’s principal shrine, however, is the Parshuram temple complex, which is built in the traditional Pahari style with gabled slate roof and extensive use of wood and stone. The exterior wooden balconies and pillars are elaborately carved in folk style, depicting scenes from the Hindu mythology. The temple complex resembles a hill fortress, which encloses a small courtyard with the only entrance from the western side. The northern section of the temple is a double-storeyed structure, which houses the legendary bhandar (storehouse) that is believed to contain priceless artefacts of which little is known.

Legend
Nirmand is believed to have been established by Parshurama during the Mahabharata era. There are more memorabilia supposed to be from the same time. On the way to Shrikhand Peak, there are the famous 'Bhima-Pathara', which basically means 'Bhima-Stone', these are said to be rocks that Bhima used to make his way to heaven during their ascent to Swarg Lok, alongside the other Pandavas brothers.

Demographics
According to the 2011 Census of India, Nirmand village had a population of 6,593 with 3,409 males and 3,184 females. The literacy rate was 80.89%. The scheduled castes and scheduled tribes comprised 49.92% and 0.49% of the population respectively. Though Brahmins predominate in the core old and new areas of the village, scheduled castes are dominant in other areas in the vicinity of the main village. Sunars and Rajputs are other castes found in the village.

Access
The village is well connected by a major district road with the nearby town Rampur. Regular government and private buses ply to Rampur, other nearby towns and villages, the state capital Shimla and the district headquarters Kullu.
Distance from Shimla: 147 km
Distance from Rampur: 17 km
Distance from Kullu: 180 km
Distance from Manali: 218 km

Attractions in and nearby Nirmand
 Ambika Mata Temple
 Dakhini Mahadev Temple
 Parashuram Kothi
Visheshwar Mahadev Temple in Sirkoti
Dev-dhaank Mahadev
 Shrikhand Peak
 Baga Sarahan
 Rampur Hydro Project

References

External links 
Kashi of Himalya
Shrikhand Mahadev Yatra
Nirmand block at a Glance
Buddhist Western Himalaya: A politico-religious history

Cities and towns in Kullu district
Kullu